María del Carmen González-Valerio y Sáenz de Heredia (March 14, 1930 – July 17, 1939) was a Spanish girl. Due to her heroic virtue, when she sacrificed her life to God for the salvation of her father's killers and the persecutors of the church, she was declared a venerable by Pope John Paul II on January 16, 1996.

Life 
María del Carmen González-Valerio y Sáenz de Heredia was born into a noble, militantly Catholic and Spanish Nationalist family and lived during the turbulent Spanish Civil War. She was a cousin by marriage of politician José Antonio Primo de Rivera. As a child she was known for her deep piety. Her father, Julio González-Valerio, the second son of the Marqués de Casa Ferrandel, was taken away in 1936 by a group of militia men to be executed. He told his wife, Carmen, to tell their children that: "Our children are too young, they don't understand. Tell them later that their father gave up his life for God and for Spain, so that our children may be raised in a Catholic Spain, where the crucifix reigns over in schools." Their mother sought refuge at the Belgian Embassy in 1937, while Mari Carmen and her siblings were cared for by aunts. The children were also granted asylum when the ambassador learned that the Communists planned to abduct the González-Valerio children and send them to Russia to be raised as Marxists.

The family later sought safety in San Sebastian and Mari Carmen was sent to a boarding school, School of the Reverend Irish Mothers of the Blessed Virgin Mary, in Zalla. She prayed for the conversion of the men who had killed her father. She offered up her own suffering and death for the conversion of politician Manuel Azaña. Supporters for her canonization say that Azaña was converted on his deathbed in 1940.  After weeks of illness, Maria del Carmen died of scarlet fever at the age of nine years, four months. She had initially predicted she would die on July 16, the feast of her patron saint, Our Lady of Mount Carmel, but when she learned her aunt would be married on that day, she said she would die on July 17, the following day. Her last words were reportedly "I die as a martyr. Please, doctor, let me go now. Don't you see that the Blessed Virgin has come with the angels to get me?" and "Jesus, Mary, Joseph, may I breathe forth my soul with you." Witnesses at her death bed said her body emitted a sweet perfume and she did not look dead.

Canonization efforts 
Her prominent family made a case for her canonization following her death, presenting the witnesses who had witnessed her death and heard her dying words and producing a diary Mari Carmen had kept. She had written "Long Live Spain! Long Live Christ the King" which was a battle cry given by those killed fighting in the Spanish Civil War. She told a nurse in the hospital: "My father died as a martyr. Poor mommy! And I am dying as a victim." For the child, Azaña was an representation of the government who had killed her father. She told an aunt that she wanted to make sacrifices and pray for the men who had killed her father. Her death represented Catholic teachings of self-sacrifice and martyrdom to save others from their sins.

Sources

References 

1930 births
1939 deaths
Roman Catholic child venerables
Deaths from streptococcus infection
Spanish children
Venerated Catholics by Pope John Paul II